The Soga (or Basoga) are a Bantu ethnic group native to the kingdom of Busoga in eastern Uganda.

History

Early contact with European explorers 

Busoga's written history began in 1862. On 28 July Royal Geographical Society explorer John Hanning Speke arrived at Ripon Falls (near Jinja, where the Victoria Nile flows from Lake Victoria and begins its descent to Egypt. Since Speke's route (inland from the East African coast) took him around the southern end of Lake Victoria, he approached Busoga from the west (through Buganda). Having reached his goal (the source of the Nile), he turned northward and followed the river downstream without exploring Busoga. He records, however, being told that Usoga (Swahili for Busoga) was an island (it is bordered on all four sides by water).

References

Bantu people
Busoga
Ethnic groups in Uganda